

G

G